Johnson is a surname of Anglo-Norman origin meaning "Son of John". It is the second most common in the United States and 154th most common in the world. As a common family name in Scotland, Johnson is occasionally a variation of Johnston, a habitational name.

Etymology
The name itself is a patronym of the given name John, literally meaning "son of John". The name John derives from Latin Johannes, which is derived through Greek  Iōannēs from Hebrew  Yohanan, meaning "Yahweh has favoured".

Origin
The name has been extremely popular in Europe since the Christian era as a result of it being given to St John the Baptist, St John the Evangelist and nearly one thousand other Christian saints.

Other Germanic languages 
 Swedish: Johnsson, Jonsson
 Icelandic: Jónsson

See also 
 List of people with surname Johnson
Gjoni (Gjonaj)
Ioannou
Jensen
Johansson
Johns
Johnsson
Johnston
Johnstone
Jones
Jonson
Jonsson
Jovanović

References

English-language surnames
Patronymic surnames
Surnames of English origin
Swedish-language surnames
Surnames from given names